Queen of Heaven was a title given to a number of ancient sky goddesses worshipped throughout the ancient Mediterranean and the ancient Near East. Goddesses known to have been referred to by the title include Inanna, Anat, Isis, Nut, Astarte, and possibly Asherah (by the prophet Jeremiah). In Greco-Roman times, Hera and Juno bore this title. Forms and content of worship varied.

Inanna

Inanna was the Sumerian goddess of love and war. Despite her association with mating and fertility of humans and animals, Inanna was not a mother goddess and is rarely associated with childbirth. Inanna was also associated with rain and storms and with the planet Venus. The Venus tablet of Ammisaduqa, believed to have been compiled around the mid-seventeenth century BCE, referred to  the planet Venus in the tablet as the "bright queen of the sky" or "bright Queen of Heaven".

Although the title of Queen of Heaven was often applied to many different goddesses throughout antiquity, Inanna is the one to whom the title is given the most number of times. In fact, Inanna's name is commonly derived from Nin-anna which literally means "Queen of Heaven" in ancient Sumerian (It comes from the words NIN meaning "lady" and AN meaning "sky"), although the cuneiform sign for her name (Borger 2003 nr. 153, U+12239 𒈹) is not historically a ligature of the two.
In several myths, Inanna is described as being the daughter of Nanna, the ancient Sumerian god of the Moon. In other texts, however, she is often described as being the daughter of either Enki or An. These difficulties have led some early Assyriologists to suggest that Inanna may have been originally a Proto-Euphratean goddess, possibly related to the Hurrian mother goddess Hannahannah, accepted only latterly into the Sumerian pantheon, an idea supported by her youthfulness, and that, unlike the other Sumerian divinities, she at first had no sphere of responsibilities.
The view that there was a Proto-Euphratean substrate language in Southern Iraq before Sumerian is not widely accepted by modern Assyriologists. In Sumer Inanna was hailed as "Queen of Heaven" in the third millennium BC. In Akkad to the north, she was worshipped later as Ishtar. In the Sumerian Descent of Inanna, when Inanna is challenged at the outermost gates of the underworld, she replies: 

Her cult was deeply embedded in Mesopotamia and among the Canaanites to the west. F. F. Bruce describes a transformation from a Venus as a male deity to Ishtar, a female goddess by the Akkadians. He links Ishtar, Tammuz, Innini, Ma (Cappadocia), Mami, Dingir-Mah, Cybele, Agdistis, Pessinuntica and the Idaean Mother to the cult of a great
mother goddess.

Astarte 

The goddess, the Queen of Heaven, whose worship Jeremiah so vehemently opposed, may have been possibly Astarte.
Astarte  is the name of a goddess as known from Northwestern Semitic regions, cognate in name, origin and functions with the goddess Ishtar in Mesopotamian texts. Another transliteration is ‘Ashtart; other names for the goddess include Hebrew עשתרת (transliterated Ashtoreth), Ugaritic ‘ṯtrt (also ‘Aṯtart or ‘Athtart), Akkadian DAs-tar-tú (also Astartu) and Etruscan Uni-Astre (Pyrgi Tablets).

According to scholar Mark S. Smith, Astarte may be the Iron Age (after 1200 BC) incarnation of the Bronze Age (to 1200 BC) Asherah.

Astarte was connected with fertility, sexuality, and war. Her symbols were the lion, the horse, the sphinx, the dove, and a star within a circle indicating the planet Venus. Pictorial representations often show her naked. Astarte was accepted by the Greeks under the name of Aphrodite. The island of Cyprus, one of Astarte's greatest faith centers, supplied the name Cypris as Aphrodite's most common byname. Asherah was worshipped in ancient Israel as the consort of El and in Judah as the consort of Yahweh and Queen of Heaven (the Hebrews baked small cakes for her festival):

Hebrew Bible references
The "Queen of Heaven" is mentioned in the Bible and has been associated with a number of different goddesses by different scholars, including: Anat, Astarte or Ishtar, Ashtoreth, or as a composite figure. 
The worship of a "Queen of Heaven" (Malkath haShamayim) is recorded in the Book of Jeremiah, in the context of the Prophet condemning such religious worship and it being the cause of God declaring that He would remove His people from the land.

In Jeremiah 44:15-18:

There was a temple of Yahweh in Egypt at that time, the 6th-7th centuries BC, that was central to the Jewish community at Elephantine in which Yahweh was worshipped in conjunction with the goddess Anath (also named in the temple papyri as Anath-Bethel and Anath-Iahu).

The goddesses Asherah, Anat and Astarte first appear as distinct and separate deities in the tablets discovered in the ruins of the library of Ugarit (modern Ras Shamra, Syria). Some biblical scholars tend to regard these goddesses as one, especially under the title "Queen of heaven".

John Day states that "there is nothing in first-millennium BC texts that singles out Asherah as 'Queen of Heaven' or associates her particularly with the heavens at all." F. F. Bruce, an evangelical (Biblical) scholar differentiates between Astarte and Asherah as two distinct feminine deities.

Isis

Isis was venerated first in Egypt. As per the Greek historian Herodotus, writing in the fifth century BC, Isis was the only goddess worshiped by all Egyptians alike, and whose influence was so widespread by that point, that she had become completely syncretic with the Greek goddess Demeter. It is after the conquest of Egypt by Alexander the Great, and the Hellenization of the Egyptian culture initiated by Ptolemy I Soter, that she eventually became known as 'Queen of Heaven'.
Lucius Apuleius confirms this in Book 11, Chap 47 of his novel, The Golden Ass, in which his character prays to the "Queen of Heaven". The goddess herself responds to his prayer, delivering a lengthy monologue in which she explicitly identifies herself as both the Queen of Heaven and Isis. 
Then with a weeping countenance, I made this orison to the puissant Goddess, saying: O blessed Queen of Heaven...
Thus the divine shape breathing out the pleasant spice of fertile Arabia, disdained not with her divine voice to utter these words unto me: Behold Lucius I am come, thy weeping and prayers has moved me to succor thee. I am she that is the natural mother of all things, mistress and governess of all the elements, the initial progeny of worlds, chief of powers divine, Queen of Heaven... and the Egyptians which are excellent in all kind of ancient doctrine, and by their proper ceremonies accustomed to worship me, do call me Queen Isis.

See also
 Astrotheology
 Doumu, as the queen of heaven and mother of all the stars in Chinese religion and Taoism.
 Heavenly Mother
 Mazu, also commonly known as the "Empress of Heaven".
 Nuit, also known as "Lady of the Starry Heaven".
 Queen Mother of the West, as the queen of heaven and mistress of all the goddess in Chinese religion and mythology.

References

 
Deities in the Hebrew Bible
Deities of classical antiquity
Levantine mythology
Religion in ancient Israel and Judah
Sky and weather goddesses
Inanna
Book of Jeremiah